Statia Day is a national holiday celebrated in the Caribbean island of Sint Eustatius, a special municipality of the Kingdom of the Netherlands. It celebrates the "First Salute", when Sint Eustatius (known locally as Statia) became the first country to recognize the United States.

References

National holidays